Ndu may refer to:
 Ndu, Cameroon, a town and commune in Cameroon
 Ndu, Democratic Republic of the Congo, a settlement in northern Congo
 Ndu languages, a language family of Papua New Guinea
 Ndo language, a language of Uganda and Congo

NDU may refer to:
National Defense University, Republic of China (Taiwan)
National Defence University, Islamabad, Pakistan
National Defense University, United States
National Distribution Union, a trade union in New Zealand
Nationaldemokratisk Ungdom (National Democratic Youth), Swedish youth organisation
Naval Diving Unit (Singapore), part of Singapore Navy
Ndejje University, Uganda
New Design University, Austria
Niger Delta University, Nigeria
The Nippon Dental University, Japan
Notre Dame (disambiguation)#Universities and Colleges